Bear Poplar is an unincorporated community mostly within Steele Township in Rowan County, North Carolina, United States. Parts extend into neighboring Mount Ulla Township.

History
There are two stories of the name origin. The community was first known as Forty-Four because it was located 44 miles from Charlotte and Winston-Salem. The community got its name Bear Poplar around 1775 when Thomas Cowan was walking with his wife and child about a mile away from his farm when they noticed a bear up a big poplar tree. According to another source, the community was first known as Rocky Mount, the name of a plantation owned by Henry Kesler. It was renamed to Bear Poplar in 1878 when the first post office was established.

Although a road bears the name of the community, the center of Bear Poplar isn't at Bear Poplar Road. It is located about a mile away at the intersection of NC 801 Hwy, Hall, & Graham roads. The community extends about a mile in each direction from this intersection.

At some point Bear Poplar had four stores, two cotton gins, a foundry, a garage, a blue granite quarry, a school, and a post office. The first Post Mistress, Lucy J. Kistler, was appointed in 1878. Bear Poplar Post Office ceased operation in 1966. The community is now served by Mount Ulla Post Office.

An ancestral seat of Cowan and Krider families, Wood Grove, is in Bear Poplar. 

Mount Ulla Barn Quilt, the largest community barn quilt in the United States in 2019, is on the wall of a local Bear Poplar store, West Rowan Farm, Home & Garden. The Mount Ulla Community Barn Quilt is 500 square feet, twenty square feet larger than the previous title holder – a community barn quilt in Ashland, Kansas.

References

Unincorporated communities in Rowan County, North Carolina
Unincorporated communities in North Carolina